Javier Eduardo "Javi" González Vejar (born April 15, 1989) is a Puerto Rican professional basketball player for the Vaqueros de Bayamón in the Baloncesto Superior Nacional (BSN).

High school
González played for coach Marcos Rodriguez at Miami's Dr. Michael M. Krop High School in Miami, Florida. He averaged 20.7 points, 7.3 rebounds and 5.0 assists as a senior. González was tabbed the Class 6-A Florida Player of the Year, First-team all-state and All-Dade County, Miami-Dade County Co-Player of the Year, Miami Herald's Player of the Year, Team reached the 6-A state quarterfinals, and finished 28-4. Earned Co-MVP honors at Florida's 2007 Senior Showcase. Led the East squad with 15 points and four assists in 18 minutes of action. Also finished second in the Three-Point Shootout. MVP of the Dade-Broward All-Star game, scoring all 12 points in the second half, 12 of the team's final 16 points for the win. Played his first two years of high school basketball at St. Patrick's in New Jersey. Named second-team all-state as a sophomore. Rated as a three-star prospect and the No. 14 player in Florida by rivals.com.

NC State
Javi Gonzalez played college basketball for the NC State Wolfpack in the Atlantic Coast Conference.  Gonzalez was a 4 year starter for the Pack and became a fan favorite due to his grit and fiery play on the court.  Under head coach Sidney Lowe, Gonzalez averaged 6.4 points and 2.8 assists per game and shot 34.3% from three point range.  

In 2009, Gonzalez hit a 3-pointer against #7 Duke with 1 second on the shot clock that clinched the win for the Wolfpack. In 2010, he scored a record-breaking 10 points in 23.3 seconds against Arizona.

Professional career
On 9 September 2012, González signed with Kolín of the Czech NBL.

National team career
González was selected for Puerto Rico men's national basketball team in 2014 and 2015. He participated in two FIBA tournaments representing Puerto Rico. He played at the 2015 FIBA Americas Championship, where he averaged 7.0 points and 4.3 rebounds in four games. Additionally, he played at the Marchand Continental Championship Cup, where he averaged 7.7 points over three games.

References

1989 births
Living people
Aguacateros de Michoacán players
Baloncesto Superior Nacional players
BC Kolín players
BK Iskra Svit players
Caciques de Humacao players
Cangrejeros de Santurce basketball players
Guards (basketball)
Melilla Baloncesto players
NC State Wolfpack men's basketball players
People from Carolina, Puerto Rico
Puerto Rican expatriate basketball people in the Czech Republic
Puerto Rican expatriate basketball people in Mexico
Puerto Rican expatriate basketball people in Slovakia
Puerto Rican expatriate basketball people in Spain
Puerto Rican men's basketball players